Clarence K. Nishihara is a Democratic member of the Hawaii Senate, representing the state's 18th district since his appointment in 2004. He is the Chair of the Committee on Public Safety, Intergovernmental and Military Affairs.

Nishihara announced at the end of the 2022 legislative session that he will be retiring from the Legislature, and will not run in the 2022 Hawaii Senate election.

References

External links
Hawaii Senate - Clarence K. Nishihara 
Project Vote Smart - Senator Clarence K. Nishihara (HI) profile
Follow the Money - Clarence K. Nishihara
2006 2004 campaign contributions

Democratic Party Hawaii state senators
Living people
Hawaii politicians of Japanese descent
21st-century American politicians
Year of birth missing (living people)